Sementa Rajhard (born 4 January 1991) is a Croatian actress and singer.

Biography 
Rajhard was born in Rijeka to her father Ladislav and her mother Melita. She grew up in Oroslavje. She sang in church as a member of the choir. 

In 2009 she participated in the show Star Search Croatia, and she made her first role in the television series Stella, where she embodied Jasmina Klarić. She also voiced Anna in the Croatian version of Frozen.

Filmography

Movie roles

Television roles

Voice acting

References

External links
 

Croatian film actresses
Croatian television actresses
Croatian voice actresses
1991 births
Croatian pop singers
21st-century Croatian women singers
Living people
Actors from Rijeka